Adrijan Antunović (born 24 April 1989) is a Croatian football player currently playing for SV Schmöckwitz-Eichwalde.

Club career
Antunović began his career in 1996 with 1. FC Union Berlin and was on 20 June 2007 promoted to the Regionalliga Nordost team. He made his debut for 1. FC Union Berlin in the 3. Liga against FC Bayern München II and played 29 minutes.

Personal life
Antunović was born in Jajce to Croatian parents, just before the breakup of Yugoslavia and the war. His parents and two aunts were killed on 24 December 2006 in Croatia.

References

1989 births
Living people
People from Jajce
Croats of Bosnia and Herzegovina
Bosnia and Herzegovina emigrants to Germany
Association football midfielders
Croatian footballers
Croatia youth international footballers
1. FC Union Berlin players
NK Lokomotiva Zagreb players
FC Viktoria 1889 Berlin players
VSG Altglienicke players
3. Liga players
NOFV-Oberliga players
Croatian Football League players
Regionalliga players
Landesliga players
Croatian expatriate footballers
Expatriate footballers in Germany
Croatian expatriate sportspeople in Germany